Josef Stejskal may refer to:

 Josef Stejskal (artist), Czech-born Australian poster artist
 Josef Stejskal (dramatist) (1897–1942), Czech theatre director
 Josef Stejskal (wrestler) (1889–?), Czech-born Austro-Hungarian olympian